Michael Ehrenfried Baume AO (born 6 July 1930) is an Australian former Liberal Party politician who represented the Division of Macarthur in the House of Representatives and the state of New South Wales in the Senate.  He left politics in 1996 to become the Australian Consul-General in New York.

Biography
Born in Sydney, Baume earned a B.A. from the University of Sydney, and before entering Parliament worked as a company director, journalist, author, music critic, stockbroker (he was a partner in the Sydney firm, Patrick Partners), television panellist and radio commentator. In 1967 his book on the controversies surrounding the creation of the Sydney Opera House, The Sydney Opera House Affair, was published by Thomas Nelson and Sons.

Baume was elected to represent the Division of Macarthur in the 1975 federal election, and re-elected in 1977 and 1980 before losing the seat to Labor candidate Colin Hollis as the Coalition lost the 1983 election. While in the House of Representatives, Baume acted as Parliamentary Secretary to the Treasurer, John Howard, from May 1982 until the electoral defeat in March 1983.

In the 1984 election, Baume stood successfully as a Senate candidate in New South Wales. His term as Senator began on 1 July 1985, and he was re-elected in 1987 and 1993 before resigning from the Senate on 9 September 1996 to become Consul-General in New York (1996–2001).  There he was elected President of the Society of Foreign Consuls (1999–2001) and was awarded the medal of the Foreign Policy Association (New York) for services to US-Australian relations. On 9 June 1999, Baume was made an Officer of the Order of Australia, "for service to the arts and the development of cultural life in Australia and internationally, to the Australian parliament and to the financial services industry."

On his return to Australia, Baume was appointed a member of the Superannuation Complaints Tribunal for two years and was a foundation member of the Board of the United States Studies Centre at the University of Sydney. He is a member of the Council of the Sydney Symphony Orchestra and is a regular columnist in The Australian Financial Review. He is Special Counsel to Sydney public relations and government relations firm, Wells Haslem Strategic Public Affairs Pty Ltd.

See also 

 List of Jewish members of the Australian parliament

References

 

1930 births
Living people
Liberal Party of Australia members of the Parliament of Australia
Members of the Australian House of Representatives
Members of the Australian House of Representatives for Macarthur
Members of the Australian Senate
Members of the Australian Senate for New South Wales
Consuls-General of Australia in New York
Officers of the Order of Australia
People educated at North Sydney Boys High School
20th-century Australian politicians